Simtokha Dzong ('dzong' means "castle-monastery")  also known as Sangak Zabdhon Phodrang (Bhutanese language meaning: "Palace of the Profound Meaning of Secret Mantras") is a small dzong. It was built in 1629 by Zhabdrung Ngawang Namgyal, who unified Bhutan. It is the first of its kind built in Bhutan. An important historical monument and former Buddhist monastery, today it houses one of the premier Dzongkha language learning institutes. It recently underwent renovation.

Location
The dzong is at strategic security location on a prominent ridge vis-a-vis the Thimphu valley and approach roads to the Dochula Pass and eastern Bhutan.

History

The Simtoka Dzong, built in 1629 by Zhabdrung Ngawang Namgyal, functions as a monastic and administrative centre and is the oldest dzong which has survived in its original form; Namgyal brought into vogue, for the first time in Bhutan, this concept of the "dzong" as castle monastery. An attack on the dzong was made by five disgruntled lamas in collaboration with an invading army of Tibetans who were against the Buddhist practices of the dzong under the control of Zhabdrung. They were defeated and Palden Lama who was the leader of the invaders died in the battle. Another attack on the dzong in 1630 by the Tibetans was successful for a while till part of the dzong caught fire and with the roof collapsing all the invading forces were killed.

The first renovation and extension works on the dzong was completed in 1670 by Mingyur Tenpa, the third Druk Desi (regent). It has undergone many renovations in subsequent years also and the most recent refurbishing was carried out by architects from Japan.

It is believed that the dzong provided protection against a demon which had disappeared into a rock close to the site and hence taken the name 'Simtoka' meaning "simmo" (demoness) and  'do' meaning "stone".

The Buddhist school of Linguistics was established as part of the dzong by the third Druk Gyalpo, Jigme Dorji Wangchuck, at the suggestion of Queen Mayum Choying Wangmo Dorje, in 1961.

Bhutanese Prime Minister Lotay Tshering and Indian Prime Minister Narendra Modi held an official meeting and documents exchange ceremony at Simtokha Dzong on 17 August 2019. This was the first time that the monument was used as a venue for international diplomacy.

Features

The dzong built over three floors is covered on the exterior at the lowest level with prayer wheels where there is also an array of 300 carvings made of slate which depict saints and philosophers. The main lhakhang (chapel) has a large image of the Sakyamuni (Buddha), with images of eight bodhisattvas on both sides. There are many dark mural paintings within this lakhang which are said to be some of the oldest in Bhutan. The chapel to the west of the main Lhakahan has images of Chenresig, green and white Taras (designated as both green and white). There is also an old painting of Zhabdrung Ngawang Namgyal, the founder of the dzong which was cleaned in 1995 but still shows signs of cracks. Also seen on the pillars of the eastern goenkhang are the tiger's tails and guns. There are chapels dedicated to the Yeshe Goennpo (Mahakala) and Pelden Lhamo, the protector deities of Bhutan.

In the  genre of the Himlayan mural paintings of Himalayas, the cosmic mandala in the dzong is considered unique. It is a circle that is painted on the ceiling in the assembly hall or Tshogdu, within a square  in the form of mountain ranges with yellow concentric squares. The  circles within it are painted  in several colours, making it distinctive, represents the twelve months of the year. The path of the course of sun's movement is painted as a line in the form of an ellipse in brick red colour; moons are also represented.

References

Bibliography

Dzongs in Bhutan
Buddhist monasteries in Bhutan
Buildings and structures in Thimphu
Buildings and structures completed in 1629
Religious buildings and structures completed in 1629
1629 establishments in Asia